This is a list of products using processors (i.e. central processing units) based on the ARM architecture family, sorted by generation release and name.



List of products

See also

 ARM architecture family
 Semiconductor intellectual property core (IP cores)
 List of ARM processors
 Field-programmable gate array cores – processors for FPGA

Notes

References